Agyneta subtilis is a species of sheet weaver found in the Palearctic. It was described by O.P.-Cambridge in 1863.

References

subtilis
Spiders of Europe
Palearctic spiders
Spiders described in 1863